Galina Valentinovna Chistyakova (born 26 July 1962) is a retired athlete who represented the Soviet Union and later Slovakia.  She is the current world record holder in the long jump, jumping 7.52 metres on 11 June 1988. She is the 1988 Olympic bronze medalist and the 1989 World Indoor champion. She is also a former world record holder (pre IAAF) in the triple jump with 14.52 metres in 1989.

Biography
Born in Izmail, Ukrainian SSR, Chistyakova trained at Burevestnik in Moscow. Competing in long jump, Galina Chistyakova won the 1985 European Indoor Championships and a silver medal at the European Championships one year later. In 1988 she managed to win an Olympic bronze medal in Seoul as well as jumping 7.52 metres, the current world record for women. More gold medals at Indoor Championships followed, and in 1990 she even won the first triple jump event held at the European Indoor Championships. Later that year she underwent a knee operation but never returned to her old form.

After the dissolution of the Soviet Union she became a Russian citizen. At the end of her career she received Slovak citizenship and represented Slovakia. She used to hold the Slovak triple jump record with 14.41 metres, achieved in July 1996 in London. This mark was bettered by Dana Velďáková. Married to retired triple jumper Aleksander Beskrovnyi, the couple now lives in Slovakia.

International competitions

Records

References

External links
 
 
 
 
 

1962 births
Living people
People from Izmail
Athletes (track and field) at the 1988 Summer Olympics
Olympic athletes of the Soviet Union
Olympic bronze medalists for the Soviet Union
Athletes (track and field) at the 1996 Summer Olympics
Olympic athletes of Slovakia
World Athletics record holders
Burevestnik (sports society) athletes
Ukrainian female long jumpers
Ukrainian female triple jumpers
Slovak female long jumpers
Slovak female triple jumpers
Soviet female long jumpers
Soviet female triple jumpers
European Athletics Championships medalists
Medalists at the 1988 Summer Olympics
Olympic bronze medalists in athletics (track and field)
Goodwill Games medalists in athletics
CIS Athletics Championships winners
World Athletics Indoor Championships winners
Competitors at the 1986 Goodwill Games
Friendship Games medalists in athletics
Sportspeople from Odesa Oblast